Stephen Mann may refer to:

Stephen Mann (chemist) (born 1955), British academic
Stephen Mann (theater owner) (born 1954), American businessman
Steve Mann (inventor) (born 1962), Canadian inventor and professor
Steve Mann (guitarist) (1943–2009), American musician
Stevie Mann (born 1976), Irish musician